Joe Doria is an American  Hammond Organ keyboardist from Seattle, Washington. Playing many styles, Doria has backed solo artists from the Seattle area and is a member of several Seattle based groups, some of which have toured nationally. These include McTuff and his own Joe Doria Trio,  as well as The Drunken Masters, Skerik's Syncopated Taint Septet, AriSawkaDoria, Swampdweller and The Last Mile.

Doria has consistently received positive reviews. The Stranger praised him as "all solid...  omni present... (and the) backbone holding it all down," and stated that he "never lets his immense chops get in the way of momentum or soul." All About Jazz says his "deft... tasteful roadhouse temperament never allows the pieces to veer off course."

Performances in Fall of 2007 include The Joe Doria Trio with Chris Spencer on guitar and Byron Vannoy on drums and McTuff with Skerik on saxophone, Andy Coe on guitar and Dvonne Lewis on drums. Tarik Abouzied eventually joined McTuff, replacing Dvonne Lewis on drums.

Discography 
 2003: Skerik's Syncopated Taint Septet [live] (Ropeadope)
 2006: Skerik's Syncopated Taint Septet: Husky (Hyena)
 2010: Skerik's Syncopated Taint Septet: Live at The Triple Door (Royal Potato Family)
 2009: McTuff: Volume 1 (with Skerik) (Doria Music)
 2011: McTuff: Volume 2 – After The Show (Doria Music)
 2015: McTuff: Volume 3 – The Root (Doria Music)

References 

AriSawkaDoria Edward Zucker, All About Jazz, Retrieved November 29, 2007
Behind the McTuff Exterior Court Scott, JamBase, October 22, 2008 Retrieved October 23, 2008

External links 
Joe Doria - official site
Joe Doria at MySpace

Living people
Year of birth missing (living people)
Musicians from Seattle
Musicians from Washington (state)
American jazz organists
American male organists
21st-century American keyboardists
21st-century organists
21st-century American male musicians
American male jazz musicians
Skerik's Syncopated Taint Septet members